Mattioli Woods is a provider of wealth management and employee benefit services with multiple offices throughout the UK, including; Aberdeen, Belfast, Birmingham, Edinburgh, Glasgow, Leatherhead, Leicester, Manchester and Newmarket.  The company is listed on the London Stock Exchange and is a constituent of the Alternative Investment Market.

History
Mattioli Woods was founded in 1991 by Ian Mattioli and Bob Woods before floating on the London Stock Exchange's Alternative Investment Market in 2005 with a market capitalisation of £22.5 million. The Group administers more than 11,000 clients throughout the United Kingdom and holds over £15 billion of assets under management, administration and advice. 

The company has increased through a blend of natural growth and acquisitions of companies including Hurley Partners, Broughton Financial Planning, Maven Capital Partners UK LLP and Ludlow Wealth Management Group Ltd. 

Mattioli Woods has several partnerships and sponsorships with organisations including AAT, Rugby League Cares, Family Business United, Rothley10k and Paralympian Sammi Kinghorn. In the summer of 2016 they joined forces with Leicester Tigers, the most successful English rugby union club since the inception of league rugby in 1987, to becoming an official sponsor of their shirt and stand.  In October 2020 this sponsorship expanded to include naming rights to their stadium which is now known as Mattioli Woods Welford Road. The 2021/22 season has also seen them become sponsors of the training kit.

Both Ian Mattioli and Bob Woods were presented with MBEs in May 2017 by Charles, Prince of Wales in an investiture ceremony at Buckingham Palace, in recognition of their “services to business and the community”.

References

External links
Official website

Financial services companies of the United Kingdom
Companies listed on the London Stock Exchange
1991 establishments in England
Publicly traded companies
Companies based in Leicester
Financial services companies established in 1991